"Fable" is a song by Italian musician Robert Miles, released in May 1996 as the second single from his debut album, Dreamland (1996). The song features uncredited vocals from Fiorella Quinn. Like "Children", the single received universal acclaim. It was a hit in several countries, reaching top ten in Austria, Belgium, Finland, France, Germany, Hungary, Iceland, Ireland, Italy, Scotland, Spain, Switzerland and UK. Its highest position in Europe was number 1 in Italy. The song was charted in 1997, as third single (after "Children" and "One and One"), on the US Billboard Hot Dance Club Play chart on which it peaked at number one for one week. In the United States and Europe, the song was featured in advertising to promote the 1998 film Ever After starring Drew Barrymore.

Critical reception
AllMusic editor Jose F. Promis wrote that the song "continues with the same formula he utilized in "Children", this time using ethereal female chant-like vocals (also included is an instrumental version of "Fable")." Larry Flick from Billboard noted that "on this third instrumental epic from the highly influential album "Dreamland" Miles continues to blend racing dance beats with new-age sweetened keyboards with a flair that is difficult to fully duplicate or describe. You simply have to let the melody wash over your senses, while the groove inspires your body to move." A reviewer from Music Week rated the song three out of five. The magazine's Alan Jones added, "Robert Miles follows his platinum single Children with Fable, another enchanting instrumental outing. It's a tad too similar, with the same throbbing NRGetic underpinning and lush strings with only the slight overlaid melody to distinguish it. Pleasant, easy listening and a hit—but don't expect it to come near Children in the popularity stakes."

Music video
The accompanying music video for "Fable" was directed by Maria Mochnacz. In it, Robert Miles falls asleep on his sofa, in front of the television. On the wall behind him, three girls are performing a choreography of synchronized swimming.

Track listings

CD single
 Belgium
 "Fable" (radio edit) – 3:50
 "Fable" (message radio edit) – 4:00

 France
 "Fable" (message radio edit) – 4:08
 "Fable" (radio edit) – 3:52

CD maxi
 France
 "Fable" (message radio edit) – 4:08
 "Fable" (radio edit) – 3:52
 "Fable" (extended version) – 7:12
 "Fable" (extended message version) – 7:43
 "Fable" (club mix) – 6:22
 "Fable" (wake edit) – 4:42
 "Fable" (psycho version) – 4:30

 Germany
 "Fable" (radio edit) – 3:50
 "Fable" (message radio edit) – 4:00
 "Fable" (extended version) – 7:12
 "Fable" (club mix) – 6:23
 "Fable" (extended message version) – 7:43
 "Fable" (psycho version - NRG mix) – 4:28
 "Fable" (wake edit) – 4:44

 Italy
 "Fable" (radio edit) – 3:56
 "Fable" (message radio edit) – 4:11
 "Fable" (extended version) – 7:12
 "Fable" (message version) – 7:44
 "Fable" (club version) – 6:22
 "Fable" (wake-up version) – 4:44
 "Fable" (psycho version) – 4:30

 Netherlands
 "Fable" (radio edit) – 3:56
 "Fable" (message radio) – 4:11
 "Fable" (wake up version) – 4:30
 "Fable" (extended version) – 7:12

 UK
 "Fable" (radio edit) – 3:50
 "Fable" (extended version) – 7:12 
 "Fable" (message radio edit) – 4:00
 "Fable" (message version) – 7:30
 "Fable" (club mix) – 6:15
 "Fable" (wake up version) – 4:30
 "Fable" (psycho version) – 4:20

12" maxi
 Belgium
 "Fable" (extended version) – 7:12
 "Fable" (wake up version) – 4:30
 "Fable" (message version) – 7:30
 "Fable" (NRG mix) – 4:20

 France
 "Fable" (extended version) – 7:12
 "Fable" (wake up) – 4:44
 "Fable" (message version) – 7:43
 "Fable" (psycho version) – 4:28

 Germany
 "Fable" (extended version) – 7:12
 "Fable" (club version) – 6:23
 "Fable" (message version) – 7:43
 "Fable" (psycho version - NRG mix) – 4:28
 "Fable" (wake up) – 4:44

 Italy
 "Fable" (message version) – 7:43
 "Fable" (psycho version - NRG mix) – 4:28
 "Fable" (extended version) – 7:12
 "Fable" (wake-up version) – 4:44

 UK
 "Fable" (extended version) – 7:12
 "Fable" (wake up version) – 4:30
 "Fable" (extended message version) – 7:43
 "Fable" (club mix) – 6:15

Double 12"
 France
 "Fable" (extended version) – 7:12
 "Fable" (extended message version) – 7:43
 "Fable" (wake up) – 4:42
 "Fable" (psycho version) – 4:30
 "Fable" (club mix) – 6:22

 Germany
 "Fable" (extended version) – 7:12
 "Fable" (club mix) – 6:23
 "Fable" (extended message version) – 7:43
 "Fable" (psycho version - NRG mix) – 4:28
 "Fable" (wake up) – 4:44

 Italy
 "Fable" (extended version) – 7:12
 "Fable" (extended message version) – 7:43
 "Wake Up" – 4:44
 "Fable" (psycho version - NRG mix) – 4:28
 "Fable" (club mix) – 6:23

Charts

Weekly charts

Year-end charts

Certifications

Release history

References

1990s instrumentals
1996 singles
1996 songs
Arista Records singles
Deconstruction Records singles
Electronic songs
Robert Miles songs
Number-one singles in Italy
Songs written by Robert Miles